The Wesley Copeland House is a historic house in rural western Stone County, Arkansas.  Located on the north side of a rural road south of Timbo, it is single-story dogtrot log house, finished in weatherboard and topped by a gable roof that overhangs the front porch.  The porch is supported by chamfered square posts, and there is a decorative sawtooth element at its cornice.  There are two chimneys, one a hewn stone structure at the western end, and a cut stone structure at the eastern end.  Built c. 1858, it is a rare antebellum house in the county, and a well-preserved example of traditional architecture.

The house was listed on the National Register of Historic Places in 1985.

See also
National Register of Historic Places listings in Stone County, Arkansas

References

Houses on the National Register of Historic Places in Arkansas
Houses completed in 1858
Houses in Stone County, Arkansas
National Register of Historic Places in Stone County, Arkansas